= Philip McCallion =

American social worker and scholar

Philip McCallion is an American social worker and scholar, currently a Distinguished Professor at University at Albany, State University of New York, and also a published author.
